Philip or Phillip Allen may refer to:
Philip Allen, Baron Allen of Abbeydale (1912–2007), British civil servant
Philip Allen (Wisconsin politician) (1832–1915), American politician from Wisconsin
Philip Allen (Rhode Island politician) (1785–1865), American politician from Rhode Island
Philip K. Allen (1910–1996), American educator and politician in the Massachusetts Senate
Phillip R. Allen (1939–2012), American stage, film, and television actor
Phillip E. Allen, American engineer
Philip Allen (footballer) (1902–1992), British footballer

See also
Allen (surname)